Mike Reese is an American politician and businessman from the state of Louisiana. A Republican, Reese has represented the Louisiana State Senate's 30th district, covering much of the state's western border with Texas, since 2020. Reese was first elected in 2019 with 51% of the vote, succeeding term-limited fellow Republican John R. Smith.

References

Living people
People from Vernon Parish, Louisiana
People from Leesville, Louisiana
Republican Party Louisiana state senators
21st-century American politicians
University of Louisiana at Monroe alumni
Year of birth missing (living people)